Ballysheil may refer to:
Ballysheil, County Down, a townland in County Down, Northern Ireland
Ballysheil, County Offaly, a townland in County Offaly, Ireland
Ballysheil Beg, a townland in County Armagh, Northern Ireland
Ballysheil More, a townland in County Armagh, Northern Ireland